Muž roku ("Man of the Year") is an annual national male beauty pageant that selects Czech Republic's representatives to participate globally. The winner of Muž roku competes in Mister International and the runners-up compete in Men Universe Model, Manhunt International, Mister Global, Man of the World and Mister United Continents pageants.

Titleholders
 Mister International   Mister Supranational   Mister Global   Man of the World   Man of the Year   Mister Grand International   Mister Tourism World   Men Universe Model   Manhunt International   Men Super Model   Mister United Continents   Mister Friendship International

First runner-up

Second runner-up

Third runner-up

Fourth runner-up

Fifth runner-up

International pageants
Color key

Mister International

Mister Supranational

Mister Global

Man of the World

Man of the Year

Mister Grand International

Mister Tourism World

Manhunt International

Men Universe Model

Men Super Model

Mister Friendship International

Mister United Continents

See also
Czech Miss

References

External links

Czech Republic
Czech Republic
Czech Republic
Czech Republic
Recurring events established in 1997
1997 establishments in the Czech Republic
Czech awards
Mister Global by country